Narve Gilje Nordås (born 30 September 1998) is a Norwegian athlete competing in middle-distance and long-distance events.

Career
Nordås' achievements include a victory in 5,000 metres and a silver medal in 10,000 metres at the 2020 Norwegian Athletics Championships. He placed fifth in 3000 metres at the 2021 European Athletics Indoor Championships.

He qualified in men's 5000 m, and was selected to represent Norway at the 2020 Summer Olympics in Tokyo in 2021. Competing in men's 5000 metres at the Olympics, he did not advance to the final. In September 2021 he became Norwegian champion on 5000 metres.

He represents the club Sandnes IL, and is coached by Gjert Ingebrigtsen.

Personal bests
Outdoor
1500 metres – 	3:36.23 (Huelva 2022)
Mile – 3:56.62 (Bergen 2020)
3000 metres – 	7:41.31 (Lahti 2021)
5000 metres – 	13:15.82 (Oslo 2022)
10,000 metres – 28:04.42 (Oslo 2022)
Indoor
1500 metres – 	3:45.03 (Helsinki 2020)
3000 metres – 	7:50.21 (Toruń 2021)

References

External links
 
 
 
 
 

1998 births
Living people
People from Klepp
Norwegian male long-distance runners
Norwegian Athletics Championships winners
Athletes (track and field) at the 2020 Summer Olympics
Olympic athletes of Norway
Sportspeople from Rogaland
20th-century Norwegian people
21st-century Norwegian people